Gonçalo de Sousa Portugal (born 21 January 1992) is a Portuguese futsal player who plays for Sporting CP and the Portugal national team.

References

External links
Sporting CP profile

1996 births
Living people
Futsal goalkeepers
Portuguese men's futsal players
Sporting CP futsal players